Berberis arguta is a shrub in the  Berberidaceae described as a species in 1908, having been first described in 1886 at the "forma" level. It is endemic to China and is found only in the Province of Yunnan in southwestern China.

References

argentinensis
Flora of Yunnan
Plants described in 1886